Cochlearia officinalis, common scurvygrass, scurvy-grass, or spoonwort, is a species of flowering plant in the family Brassicaceae. The plant acquired its common name from the observation that it cured scurvy, and it was taken on board ships in dried bundles or distilled extracts. Its very bitter taste was usually disguised with herbs and spices; however, this did not prevent scurvygrass drinks and sandwiches becoming a popular fad in the UK until the middle of the nineteenth century, when citrus fruits became more readily available.

Description
The stems are hairless and long stalked with fleshy leaves. The leaves are heart or kidney shaped, the lower stems leaves form a rosette around the base of the plant. It is in flower from May to August, they are small, and come in white or lilac, with four daisy-like petals. The seeds ripen from July to September, they are globe shaped. The small, round seeds are reddish brown. The flowers are hermaphrodite and are pollinated by bees, flies, and beetles. The plant is self-fertile. It is also noted for attracting wildlife and not being frost tender.

Taxonomy
It is commonly known as 'common scurvy-grass', 'scurvy-grass' and 'spoonwort'.

It was formally described by the Swedish botanist Carl Linnaeus in his seminal publication 'Species Plantarum' in 1753, on page 647.

The specific epithet officinalis refers to the Linnaean term for plants with an established medicinal, culinary, or other use.

It has one known subspecies, Cochlearia officinalis subsp. integrifolia (Hartm.) Nordal & Stabbetorp.

Distribution and habitat

Cochlearia officinalis is a temperate native to Europe.

Range
It is found within Eastern Europe, in the Russian Federation, (within the Administrative centre of Arkhangelsk, Komi, Murmansk and Nenets). In Central Europe, within Belgium, Germany, Netherlands and Switzerland. In Northern Europe, within Iceland, Denmark, the Faroe Islands, Finland, Ireland, Norway, Sweden and the United Kingdom, and in Southwestern Europe within France.

It has also naturalised in other parts of Europe such as Italy and Spain.

Habitat
It grows in the coastal and mountainous regions of Europe, including the Alps. In Ireland, it prefers saltmarshes, coastal cliffs and walls, and rocky, muddy seashores. In Northern Scandinavia, it grows in gravel beaches, crevices in beach cliffs and salt marshes.

Uses
It was once used by herbalists as a cure for scurvy, as the plant contains Vitamin C. Nicholas Culpeper wrote of scurvygrass in his book, 'Complete Herbal', that its chief good effect is when used 'by those that have the scurvy' and that it 'is of singular good effect to cleanse the blood, liver and spleen, taking the juice in the Spring every morning fasting in a cup of drink'.

The leaves were also made into a beer called scurvygrass ale, it has been occasionally re-made as a craft ale.

References

officinalis
Flora of Europe
Flora of Russia
Flora of Belgium
Flora of Germany
Flora of the Netherlands
Flora of Switzerland
Flora of Denmark
Flora of the Faroe Islands
Flora of Finland
Flora of Ireland
Flora of Norway
Flora of Sweden
Flora of the United Kingdom
Plants described in 1753
Taxa named by Carl Linnaeus